The British occupation of the Faroe Islands during World War II, also known as Operation Valentine, was implemented immediately following the German invasion of Denmark and Norway. It was a small component of the roles of Nordic countries in World War II.

In April 1940, the United Kingdom occupied the strategically important Faroe Islands (which belonged to Denmark) to forestall a German invasion. British troops left shortly after the end of the war.

Occupation

At the time of the occupation, the Faroe Islands had the status of an amt (county) of Denmark. Following the invasion and occupation of Denmark on 9 April 1940, British forces launched Operation Valentine to occupy the Faroe Islands. On 11 April, Winston Churchill – then First Lord of the Admiralty – announced to the House of Commons that the Faroe Islands would be occupied:

We are also at this moment occupying the Faroe Islands, which belong to Denmark and which are a strategic point of high importance, and whose people showed every disposition to receive us with warm regard. We shall shield the Faroe Islands from all the severities of war and establish ourselves there conveniently by sea and air until the moment comes when they will be handed back to Denmark liberated from the foul thraldom into which they have been plunged by German aggression.

An announcement was broadcast on BBC radio. An aircraft of the Royal Air Force (RAF) was seen over the Faroese capital Tórshavn on the same day. On 12 April, two destroyers of the Royal Navy arrived in Tórshavn harbour. Following a meeting with Carl Aage Hilbert (the Danish prefect of the islands) and Kristian Djurhuus (president of the Løgting, the Faroese parliament), an emergency meeting of the Løgting was convened the same afternoon. Pro-independence members tried to declare the independence of the Faroe Islands from the Kingdom of Denmark but were outvoted. An official announcement was later made announcing the occupation and ordering a nighttime blackout in Tórshavn and neighbouring Argir, the censorship of post and telegraphy and the prohibition of the use of motor vehicles during the night without a permit.

On 13 April, the Royal Navy cruiser  arrived at Tórshavn. Colonel T. B. W. Sandall (the British military commander) and Frederick Mason (the new British consul to the Faroe Islands) then met with the Danish prefect, Carl Aage Hilbert, who responded with what Sandall took to be a formal protest, although he maintained that owing to the occupation of Denmark he was unable formally to represent the Danish government. He duly accepted the British terms on the basis that the UK would not seek to interfere with the internal affairs of the islands. A formal protest was made by the Løgting, albeit expressing the wish for friendly relations. 250 Royal Marines were disembarked, later to be replaced by other British troops.  In May, the Royal Marines were replaced by soldiers of the Lovat Scouts, a Scottish regiment. In 1942, they were replaced by the Cameronians (Scottish Rifles). From 1944, the British garrison was considerably reduced. The author Eric Linklater was part of the British garrison and his 1956 novel The Dark of Summer was set in the Faroe Islands during the war years.

Events

On 20 June 1940, six Swedish Navy ships arrived in the Faroe Islands. The fifth, the passenger ship Patricia, was used to take the destroyer crew to Italy and bring civilian passengers back. The sixth, the tanker Castor, was converted to naval status to bunker the ships. The Royal Navy seized all the ships under armed threat and moved them to Orkney. Although Sweden was neutral and not at war, Britain feared Germany would seize the ships if they continued to Sweden. After political negotiations Sweden secured their return. The Royal Navy had stripped equipment and caused damage to the ships, for which Britain later paid compensation. The Swedish commander was criticised by other Swedish officers for conceding the ships without resistance.

Aftermath
 

A plaque has been erected by British veterans in Tórshavn Cathedral expressing thanks for the kindness shown to them by the Faroese people during their presence. Approximately 170 marriages took place between British soldiers and Faroese women; the British Consul, Frederick Mason (1913–2008) also married a local woman, Karen Rorholm.

The Faroe Islands suffered occasional attacks by Luftwaffe aircraft but an invasion was never attempted. Drifting sea mines proved to be a considerable problem and resulted in the loss of numerous fishing boats and their crews. The trawler Nýggjaberg was sunk on 28 March 1942 near Iceland; 21 Faroese seamen were killed in the worst loss of Faroese lives in the war. Faroese ships had to hoist the Faroese flag and paint FAROES / FØROYAR on the ships' sides, thus allowing the Royal Navy to identify them as "friendly".

To prevent inflation, Danish krone banknotes in circulation on the islands were overstamped with a mark indicating their validity only in the Faroe Islands. The Faroese króna (technically the Danish krone in the Faroe Islands) was fixed at 22.4 kroner to one pound sterling. Emergency banknotes were issued and Faroese banknotes were later printed by Bradbury Wilkinson in England.

During the occupation, the Løgting was given full legislative powers, albeit as an expedient given the occupation of Denmark. Although in the 1944 Icelandic constitutional referendum, Iceland became an independent republic, Churchill refused to countenance a change in the constitutional status of the Faroe Islands whilst Denmark was still occupied. Following the liberation of Denmark and the end of World War II in Europe, the occupation was terminated in May 1945 and the last British soldiers left in September. The experience of wartime self-government left a return to the pre-war status of an amt (county) unrealistic and unpopular. The 1946 Faroese independence referendum led to local autonomy within the Danish realm in 1948.

The largest tangible sign of the British presence is the runway of Vágar Airport. Other reminders include the naval guns at the fortress of Skansin in Tórshavn, which served as the British military headquarters. A continuing reminder is the Faroese love of fish and chips and British chocolate such as Dairy Milk (which is readily available in shops throughout the islands but not in Denmark). After the occupation, instances of multiple sclerosis increased in the Faroe Islands, something which American and German neuroepidemiologists such as John F. Kurtzke and Klaus Lauer attribute to the presence of occupying British soldiers who were recuperating from multiple sclerosis on the islands.

In 1990, the Faroese government organised British Week, a celebration of the 50th anniversary of the friendly occupation. Sir Frederick Mason, the former wartime British consul to the Faroes, was also present, aged 76.

Fatalities
More than 200 Faroese seamen lost their lives at sea during World War II, most due to the war. A monument in their memory stands in Tórshavn's municipal park. Several Faroese vessels were either bombed or sunk by German submarines or by drifting sea mines. Faroese fishing vessels harvested the sea near Iceland and around the Faroe Islands and transported their catch to the UK for sale. At least one aircraft accident caused British fatalities. Five of a crew of six died in a crash of a British RAF aircraft on November 9, 1942.

Airport
The only airfield on the Faroe Islands was built in 1942–43 on the island of Vágar by the Royal Engineers under the command of Lieutenant-Colonel William E. Law. The majority of the British personnel in the Faroes were stationed at Vágar, mostly working on the construction of the airfield. Abandoned after the war, it was reopened as the civilian Vágar Airport in 1963. Left-hand traffic was in force on the roads of the island of Vágar until the British troops left the Faroe Islands.

The Faroese flag

After Germany occupied Denmark, the British Admiralty no longer allowed Faroese vessels to fly the Danish flag. This was of considerable significance given the importance of the fishing fleet to the Faroese economy. Following some intensive discussions between the British occupation authorities, the Faroese authorities and the Danish Prefect, as well as discussions between the UK Foreign Office and the Danish Embassy in London, on 25 April 1940 the British authorities recognised the Faroese flag – Merkið – as the civil ensign of the Faroe Islands.

Gallery

See also
 British invasion of Iceland
 Politics of the Faroe Islands

Notes

Footnotes

References

 

Conflicts in 1940
Occupation
Allied occupation of Europe
Military history of the United Kingdom during World War II
Battles and conflicts without fatalities
World War II occupied territories
British military occupations
British violations of the rights of neutral nations during World War II
World War II operations of the Western European Theatre
Invasions by the United Kingdom
World War II invasions
Denmark–United Kingdom relations
Sweden–United Kingdom relations
Maritime incidents in April 1940
Maritime incidents in June 1940
Battles and operations of World War II involving the United Kingdom
1940 in the Faroe Islands
Scotland in World War II
Denmark–Scotland relations